The fourth season of the American animated television series The Simpsons originally aired on the Fox network between September 24, 1992, and May 13, 1993, beginning with "Kamp Krusty". The showrunners for the fourth production season were Al Jean and Mike Reiss, with the season being produced by Gracie Films and 20th Century Fox Television.  The aired season contained two episodes which were hold-over episodes from season three, which Jean and Reiss also ran. Following the end of the production of the season, Jean, Reiss and most of the original writing staff left the show. The season was nominated for two Primetime Emmy Awards and Dan Castellaneta would win one for his performance as Homer in "Mr. Plow". The fourth season was released on DVD in Region 1 on June 15, 2004, Region 2 on August 2, 2004, and in Region 4 on August 25, 2004.

Development
The season was executive produced by Al Jean and Mike Reiss, who had also run the previous season. Several of the show's original writers who had been with the show since the first season left following the completion of the season's production run. "Cape Feare", which was the final episode to be produced by the "original team", aired during season five as a holdover. Jay Kogen, Wallace Wolodarsky and Jeff Martin wrote their final episodes for the season four production run. David M. Stern and Jon Vitti also left but returned to write episodes for later seasons. Reiss and Jean left to produce their own series, The Critic, but later returned to produce several more The Simpsons episodes, and Jean again became the showrunner starting with season thirteen. Rich Moore, one of the show's original directors, also left to work on The Critic, but returned years later to assist with animation on The Simpsons Movie. George Meyer and John Swartzwelder stayed on, while Conan O'Brien, Frank Mula and future show runners Bill Oakley and Josh Weinstein received their first writing credits. One-time writers for the season include Adam I. Lapidus and the team of Gary Apple and Michael Carrington, although Carrington later returned to voice characters in "Simpson Tide" and "Million Dollar Abie".

Sam Simon, who had been showrunner for the show's first two seasons, assembled the original writing team, been the series' creative supervisor from its inception, and has been credited as "developing [the show's] sensibility", departed at the end of season four. Simon was involved in a series of creative disputes with the show's creator Matt Groening, producer James L. Brooks and production company Gracie Films. Simon commented that he "wasn't enjoying it anymore," and "that any show I've ever worked on, it turns me into a monster. I go crazy. I hate myself." Before leaving, he negotiated a deal that saw him receive a share of the show's profits every year and an executive producer credit despite not having worked on the show since then until his death.

This season's production run (9F) was the first to be animated by Film Roman, after Gracie Films opted to switch domestic production of the series from Klasky Csupo. Sharon Bernstein of the Los Angeles Times wrote that "Gracie executives had been unhappy with the producer Csupo had assigned to The Simpsons and said the company also hoped to obtain better wages and working conditions for animators at Film Roman." Klasky Csupo co-founder Gábor Csupó had been "asked [by Gracie Films] if they could bring in their own producer [to oversee the animation production]," but declined, stating "they wanted to tell me how to run my business." Simon commented that: "There won't be any change in the quality or look of the show. We're not going to compromise the quality of the show, and key creative personnel will continue on the show."

"A Streetcar Named Marge" and "Kamp Krusty" were holdovers from the previous season and so were the last of the Klasky Csupo produced episodes to air. Brooks suggested that the script for "Kamp Krusty" be expanded and produced as a feature-length theatrically released film. However, the episode ran very short, barely reaching the minimum length allowed, with the episode's musical number having to be lengthened by a number of verses. The episode had also been selected to be the season's premiere. As Jean told Brooks, "First of all, if we make it into the movie then we don't have a premiere, and second if we can't make 18 minutes out of this episode how are we supposed to make 80?"

Voice cast & characters

Main cast
 Dan Castellaneta as Homer Simpson, Grampa Simpson, Krusty the Clown, Groundskeeper Willie, Barney Gumble and various others
 Julie Kavner as Marge Simpson, Patty Bouvier, Selma Bouvier and various others
 Nancy Cartwright as Bart Simpson, Nelson Muntz, Ralph Wiggum and various others
 Yeardley Smith as Lisa Simpson
 Harry Shearer as Mr. Burns, Waylon Smithers, Ned Flanders, Principal Skinner, Lenny Leonard, Kent Brockman, Reverend Lovejoy, and various others
 Hank Azaria as Moe Szyslak, Chief Wiggum, Professor Frink, Comic Book Guy, Apu, Bumblebee Man and various others

Recurring
 Pamela Hayden as Milhouse van Houten, Jimbo Jones
 Maggie Roswell as Maude Flanders, Helen Lovejoy and Miss Hoover
 Russi Taylor as Martin Prince
 Tress MacNeille as Mrs. Bloomenstein, Kim and Davey 
 Marcia Wallace as Edna Krabappel
 Jon Lovitz as Artie Ziff, Professor Lombardo and the doughnut delivery man
 Joe Mantegna as Fat Tony 
 Frank Welker as Santa's Little Helper, and Princess

Guest stars

 Phil Hartman as Troy McClure, Lionel Hutz, Lyle Lanley and Mr. Muntz (various episodes)
 Elizabeth Taylor as Maggie Simpson ("Lisa's First Word") and herself ("Krusty Gets Kancelled")
 Barry White as himself
 Jon Lovitz as Llewellyn Sinclair and Ms. Sinclair ("A Streetcar Named Marge")
 Bob Hope as himself ("Lisa the Beauty Queen")
 Lona Williams as Amber Dempsey ("Lisa the Beauty Queen")
 Tom Jones as himself ("Marge Gets a Job")
 Sara Gilbert as Laura Powers ("New Kid on the Block")
 Pamela Reed as Ruth Powers ("New Kid on the Block")
 Adam West as himself ("Mr. Plow")
 Linda Ronstadt as herself ("Mr. Plow")
 Leonard Nimoy as himself ("Marge vs. the Monorail")
 Michael Carrington as Sideshow Raheem ("I Love Lisa")
 Dr. Joyce Brothers as herself ("Last Exit to Springfield")
 Brooke Shields as herself ("The Front")
 David Crosby as himself ("Marge in Chains")
 Johnny Carson as himself ("Krusty Gets Kancelled")
 Hugh Hefner as himself ("Krusty Gets Kancelled")
 Bette Midler as herself ("Krusty Gets Kancelled")
 Luke Perry as himself ("Krusty Gets Kancelled")
 Red Hot Chili Peppers as themselves ("Krusty Gets Kancelled")

Awards
1993 marked the first year that the producers of The Simpsons did not submit episodes for the "Primetime Emmy Award for Outstanding Animated Program (for Programming Less Than One Hour)". Prior to this season, the series had only been allowed to compete in the animation category, but in early 1993 the rules were changed so that animated television shows would be able to submit nominations in the "Outstanding Comedy Series" category. The producers submitted "A Streetcar Named Marge" and "Mr. Plow" but the Emmy voters were hesitant to pit cartoons against live action programs, and The Simpsons did not receive a nomination. Several critics saw the show's failure to gain a nomination as one of the biggest snubs of that year. Dan Castellaneta was awarded an Emmy for "Outstanding Voice-Over Performance". "Treehouse of Horror III" was nominated for Emmys for "Outstanding Individual Achievement in Music Composition for a Series (Dramatic Underscore)" (Alf Clausen) and "Outstanding Individual Achievement in Sound Mixing for a Comedy Series or a Special".

The series won several other awards this season, including an Annie Award for "Best Animated Television Program", a Genesis Award for "Best Television Prime Time Animated Series" for the episode "Whacking Day" and a Saturn Award for "Best Television Series".

At the 9th annual Television Critics Association Awards, the fourth season of the show was nominated for 'Outstanding Achievement in Comedy' but lost to "Seinfeld." Additionally, it was nominated for 'Program of the Year,' losing to "Barbarians at the Gate."

Reception
On Rotten Tomatoes, the fourth season of The Simpsons has a 100% approval rating based on 11 critical  reviews. The sites critical consensus reads: "One word: Monorail".

Episodes

DVD release
The DVD boxset for season four was released by 20th Century Fox in the United States and Canada on June 15, 2004, eleven years after it had completed broadcast on television. As well as every episode from the season, the DVD release features bonus material including deleted scenes, Animatics, and commentaries for every episode. The menus are a different format than the previous seasons.

References

Bibliography

External links

Season 4 at the BBC

Simpsons season 04
1992 American television seasons
1993 American television seasons